Georges-Robert Lefort (27 February 1875 – December 1954) was a French architect. At least three of his works have been designated national historical monuments.

Birth and education 
Georges-Robert Lefort was born on 27 February 1875 in Paris. His father was employed by the Crédit Foncier de France. He obtained a bachelor's degree in science, then studied architecture under François Goemans from 1895 to 1896. He was admitted to the École des Beaux-Arts of Paris, where he was a pupil of Edmond Jean Baptiste Paulin. He won several prizes and medals between 1899 and 1903.

Career 
Lefort settled in Guingamp at the start of the 20th century, and was to become the leading architect in Brittany. He was appointed architect for the town of Rennes in 1910. Between 1923 and 1942 he was architect for the Historical Monuments department of the Ministry of Culture. From 1923 to 1934 he was a professor at the École Régionale des Beaux-Arts, Rennes, and from 1935 to 1947 he was a director of this school. He was actively involved in associations such as the Syndicat des architectes du Nord-Ouest and the Association provinciale des architectes français. Lefort died in December 1954 at the age of 79.

Selected works 
Lefort designed many buildings in Brittany.
His work was varied in style. The hospital in Guingamp was severely neo-classical, while the Saint-Brieuc savings bank was richly eclectic. He also drew on the local Breton architectural tradition, which he found an important source of inspiration.

His works include:

Bibliography

References
Citations

Sources

1875 births
1954 deaths
Architects from Paris
École des Beaux-Arts alumni
20th-century French architects